Sir Charles Barry Shaw,  (12 April 1923 – 30 September 2010) was a Northern Irish barrister. From 1972 to 1989, he served as the Director of Public Prosecutions for Northern Ireland; he was the first holder of this post.

Early life and education
Shaw was born on 12 April 1923 in Balmoral, Belfast, Northern Ireland. He was educated at Inchmarlo House in Belfast and at Pannal Ash College in Harrogate, England. After leaving school, he matriculated into Queen's University Belfast to study science. He left university in 1942 to serve in the military. He returned to university in 1946, and switched to law. He graduated with a Bachelor of Laws (LLB) degree.

Military service
Shaw took a break from his university studies to serve in the British Army during Second World War. On 5 December 1942, he was commissioned into the Royal Regiment of Artillery as a second lieutenant. He then served in the 97 Anti-Tank Regiment attached to the 15th (Scottish) Infantry Division. He saw active serve in the Normandy Landings and in the North West Europe Campaign. He was demobilised in 1946.

Legal career
In 1948, Shaw was called to the Bar of Northern Ireland, thereby becoming a barrister. From 1948 to 1952, he worked in private practice. He was appointed Junior Crown Counsel (a prosecutor) for County Fermanagh, and then for County Tyrone and County Antrim. In 1964, he was appointed Senior Crown Counsel for County Londonderry, and later for County Antrim and Belfast. On 10 April 1972, he was appointed to the newly created position of Director of Public Prosecutions for Northern Ireland. As such, he was head of the Public Prosecution Service for Northern Ireland "throughout the worst years of the Troubles". He retired from the post in 1989, and was succeeded by Alasdair Fraser.

In December 1964, Shaw was called to the Inner Bar of Northern Ireland, thereby becoming a Queen's Counsel (QC). He was elected a Bencher in 1968. He was also called to Bar at Middle Temple in 1970 which allowed him to practice as a barrister in England and Wales.

Personal life
In 1950, Shaw married Jean Boyd; they later divorced. In 1964, he married Jane (née Phillips); she predeceased her husband, dying in January 2010.

Shaw died on 30 September 2010, aged 87. A memorial service was held at Holy Trinity Church, Glencraig in Holywood, County Down.

Honours
In the 1974 Queen's Birthday Honours, Shaw was appointed a Companion of the Order of the Bath (CB) in recognition of his service as Director of Public Prosecutions for Northern Ireland (DPP). In the 1980 New Year Honours, he was appointed a Knight Bachelor, and thereby granted the title sir, in recognition of his service as DPP. On 4 March 1980, he was knighted by Queen Elizabeth II during a ceremony at Buckingham Palace. He was made an Honorary Bencher of Middle Temple in 1986.

References

  

 
 
 

1923 births
2010 deaths
Barristers from Northern Ireland
Northern Ireland King's Counsel
Knights Bachelor
Lawyers awarded knighthoods
Companions of the Order of the Bath
Royal Artillery officers
British Army personnel of World War II
Alumni of Queen's University Belfast
Members of the Middle Temple